This Sorry Scheme is a 1924 novel by Scottish writer Bruce Marshall.  An out-spoken story of the consequences of an ill-matched marriage.
 

1924 British novels
Novels by Bruce Marshall